Pakistani clothing refers to the ethnic clothing that is typically worn by people in the country of Pakistan and by the people of Pakistani origin. Pakistani clothes express the culture of Pakistan, the demographics of Pakistan, and cultures from the Punjab, Sindh, Balochistan, Khyber Pakhtunkhwa (Pashtun), Gilgit-Baltistan, and Kashmir regions of the country. Dress in each regional culture reflect weather conditions, way of living, and distinctive style which gives it a unique identity among all cultures.

Pakistani national dress 
The Shalwar kameez, Achkan Sherwani and Kurta shalwar Kameez are the national dresses of Pakistan and is worn by men and women in all five provinces of Punjab, Sindh, Balochistan, Khyber Pakhtunkhwa, and Gilgit-Baltistan in the country and in Azad Kashmir. Shalwar refers to loose trousers and kameez refers to shirts. Since 1982, all officials working in the secretariat are required to wear the national dress.Each province has its own variant of salwar kameez such as Sindhi shalwar kameez, Punjabi shalwar kameez, Pashtun shalwar kameez, and Balochi shalwar kameez. Pakistanis wear clothes ranging from exquisite colours and designs to various types of fabric such as silk, chiffon, cotton, etc.

Men's clothing 
Men wear shalwar kameez, kurta, Pakistani Waistcoat, achkan and sherwani, churidar, or pajama. Other items of clothing include the jama and the angarkha. Headgear includes turbans, the Jinnah Cap, also called Karakul, Fez, also called Rumi Topi, and Taqiyah (cap). Peshawari chappal and Khussa are popular foot wear. Other items include traditional shawls made of Pashmina or other warm materials especially in the Northern regions of the country, mainly, Khyber Pakhtunkhwans usually wear the Pakol hat, 

Every province has a different and unique cultural dress.

Ethnic & Regional clothing

Balochistan

In Balochistan, traditionally a long jama (robe) like a smock-frock is worn down to the heels, loose shalwar, a long chadar or scarf,  a pagri of cotton cloth, and mostly shoes that narrow at the toe. The material is thick cloth with a very wide shalwar to protect against the hot winds of the dry Sulaiman Range and Kharan Desert.

Sindh
 with a kameez called cholo. Other traditional clothing includes the Sindhi cap and Ajrak of beautiful designs which are made locally. Men also traditionally wear the dhoti and the long angerkho.

Punjab

Punjabi men wear the straight cut Punjabi shalwar kameez, kurta, or shalwar. Dhoti, lungi, or tehmat are often worn in rural areas. Other Punjabi shalwar styles include the Pothohari shalwar, Multani shalwar, Dhoti shalwar, and the Bahawalpuri shalwar which is very wide and baggy with many folds. Turban of a thin cloth is also worn especially in rural areas of Punjab where it is called pagri. Footwear include the khussa and Peshawari chappal, which is also widely worn.

Khyber Pakhtunkhwa

Pashtun dress differ according to region but usually people wear traditional Peshawari chappal as footwear and a Pakol or turban as headwear. The traditional male Pashtun dress includes the Khet partug, Peshawari shalwar, and the Patke tunban. Males usually wear kufi, Peshawari cap, turban, or Pakol as traditional headgear.

Gilgit-Baltistan

Azad Kashmir 
The clothing of Azad Kashmir includes various styles of the shalwar kameez. It is called Pheran.

Women's clothing

Shalwar kameez
Pakistani women wear the shalwar kameez which is worn in different styles, colours, and designs which can be decorated with different styles and designs of embroidery. The kameez can be of varying sleeve length, shirt length, and necklines. The drawers can be the straight-cut shalwar, patiala salwar, churidar, cigarette pajama, tulip trouser, samosa pajama, or simple trouser

Dupatta
The Dupatta is treated just as an accessory in current urban fashion. Most women who carry it nowadays wear it just as a decorative accessory; it's usually worn wrapped around the neck or hanging down the shoulder. [Dupatta] is also used by some women when entering a mosque, dargah, where they cover their head with a dupatta while entering such places. It is widely worn by women in weddings and other parties out of choice and fashion. On such occasions, mostly it is wrapped around the waist, neck, or just draped on a shoulder. It is used with different embroidery designs of Kamdani and Gota.

Burqa
In Pakistan, upper and middle-class women in towns wear burqas over their normal clothes in public. The burqa is the most visible dress in Pakistan. It is typically a tent-like garment worn over the ordinary clothes and is made of white cotton. Many upper-class women wear a two-piece burqa which is usually black in colour but sometimes navy blue or dark red. It consists of a long cloak and a separate headpiece with a drop-down face veil. Some educated urban women no longer wear the burqa. The burqa is also not worn by rural peasant women who work in the fields. In rural areas only elite women wear burqas. Purdah is still common in the rural elite and urban middle class, but not among rural farmers.

Bridal dresses 
Some Pakistani brides may choose to wear dresses known as Nikah or walima dress. The outfit is called gharara and mimics the traditional dress of India - it includes a skirt known as a lehenga/gharara and dupatta. However, instead of cholis worn by Indian women, Pakistani brides wear a long shalwar top.

Other traditional dresses 
On special occasions such as Eid more heavily embroidered iterations of the shalwar kameez are worn by Pakistani women.

Farshi Pajama is an old traditional dress which is worn occasionally. Laacha is worn in Punjab, the lower part of which resembles the dhoti.

Regional clothing

Balochistan

The typical dress of a Baloch woman consists of a long frock and shalwar with a headscarf. Balochi women wear heavy embroidered shalwar kameez and dupatta with the embroidery utilising Shisha work. The Balochi Duch from Makran District is one of the many forms of Balochi dresses and is famous all across Balochistan. Since it is purely hand embroidered, Balochi Duch is expensive and it takes months to complete a single Balochi suit.

Sindh

In addition to wearing the suthan and cholo, Sindhi women wear the lehenga and choli known as the gaji which is a pullover shirt worn in the mountain areas of Sindh. The gaji is composed of small, square panels, embroidered on silk and sequins. The neck line of the gaji is cut high, and round on one side, with a slit opening extending the other. Unmarried girls wear the opening to the back and married women, to the front. Sindhi clothing displays embroidery using mirrors.

Punjab

Punjabi women wear the straight cut Punjabi shalwar kameez, which is most frequently worn. Punjabi women, in villages,  also wear the Pothohari shalwar, the Patiala shalwar, the laacha (tehmat), kurti, ghagra, lehenga, and phulkari.

Khyber Pakhtunkhwa

In urban areas women typically wear the shalwar kameez. Pashtun women commonly wear shalwar kameez and in some regions, particularly in Tribal areas, women wear firaq partug which is also worn in neighbouring Afghanistan. In Kalash region, women wear embroidered long shirts.

Wedding dresses
In Pakistan, the traditional wedding ceremony is celebrated by wearing different clothes in each wedding event. Usually, the style and designs of wedding attire vary across different regions from north to the south among different ethnic communities. However, in major urban cities such as Karachi, Lahore, Faisalabad, and Rawalpindi, on the occasion of the Rasm-e-Heena (Mendhi), men wear an embroidered Kameez in glittering colours with simple shalwar. Up to the wedding day, the bride may wear a yellow or orange kameez, with a simple shalwar, Patiala shalwar, yellow dupatta, and yellow paranda — more commonly in the Punjab region of Pakistan. However, in other regions customs vary. For example, in the north-west, particularly in the tribal areas, it is customary for a bride to wear Firaq Partug.

During baraat and walima functions, the groom usually wears kurta shalwar or kurta churidar with special sherwani and khussa. However, in some regions, including Balochistan, among Baloch and Pashtuns (in the north of the province), and Khyber Pakhtunkhwa province, mostly among Pashtuns and Kohistanis, grooms customarily wear simple, more often white, colour shalwar Kameez and a traditional Baloch Bugti Chappal (in Baloch dominated regions) or Peshawari Chappal in Khyber Pakhtunkhwa and a traditional headwear such as the Pashtun style Patke or a Baloch style turban. In Punjab and Karachi, during the event of baraat, grooms may wear traditional sehra on their heads, and brides may normally wear a shalwar kameez.

Pakistani clothing companies and brands
The following is a list of notable Pakistani clothing companies and brands.
Khaadi
Bareeze
HSY Studio
ChenOne
Gul Ahmed
Junaid Jamshed
Nishat Linen
Sapphire Retail
Maria B
Sana Safinaz
Zainab Chottani
Sapphire

Pakistani fashion
Pakistani fashion has flourished well in the changing environment of the fashion world. Since Pakistan came into being, its fashion has been historically evolved from different phases and made its unique identity. At this time, Pakistani fashion is a combination of traditional and modern styles and it has become the cultural identification of Pakistan. Despite all modern trends, the regional and traditional dresses have developed their own significance as a symbol of native tradition. This regional fashion is not static but evolving.

Pakistan Fashion Design Council, based in Lahore, organizes Fashion Week and Fashion Pakistan, based in Karachi, organizes fashion shows in that city. Credit goes to Ayesha Tammy Haq, a British-trained lawyer and chief executive of Fashion Pakistan, who came up with the idea for Pakistan’s first fashion week, held in November 2009.

Pakistani fashion industry

Pakistani fashion industry is introducing Pakistani traditional dresses all over the world as cultural representatives and is becoming a reason to introduce international trends in Pakistan. Pakistani media, Film Industry, and Internet have the biggest roles in promoting fashion in Pakistan. There are a lot of TV Channels, Magazines, Portals, and websites which are working only for the fashion industry.

Pakistani fashion designers
 Maheen Khan
 Sadaf Malaterre
 Junaid Jamshed
 Zainab Chottani
 Maria B

Pakistani fashion Brands
 Sana Safinaz
 Khaadi
 Nishat Linen
 Sapphire
 Chen One
 Gul Ahmed
 Zainab Chottani

Pakistani fashion models
The following is a list of Pakistani models.

Male models
Ahmed Butt
Aijaz Aslam
Fawad Afzal Khan
Fahad Mustafa
Azfar Rehman
Mikaal Zulfiqar
Feroze Khan
Usama Khan

Female models
 Meesha Shafi
 Maya Ali
 Amina Haq
 Ayesha Omar
 Ayyan Ali
 Iman Ali
 Sabeeka Imam
 Juggan Kazim
 Iffat Rahim
 Mariyah Moten
 Mehreen Raheel
 Nargis Fakhri
 Noor
 Reema Khan
 Rabia Butt
 Rubya Chaudhry
 Saba Qamar
 Sadia Imam
 Sana (Lollywood)
 Sunita Marshall
 Tooba Siddiqui
 Vaneeza Ahmad
 Veena Malik
 Yasmeen Ghauri
 Zara Sheikh
 Zainab Qayyum

Pakistani fashion stylists
Pakistani stylists also have a major contribution in giving the celebrities a new look. Their work is also appreciated within and outside of Pakistan.
Here is a list of Pakistani Fashion stylists
Tariq Amin

Pakistani fashion events
Extensive fashion activities are shown in Pakistani Fashion Events held in different parts of the country as well as abroad in which versatile approaches towards new trends always amuse the spectators.

Lahore Fashion Week
Karachi Fashion Week
Peshawar Fashion Week
Miss Pakistan World

Pakistani fashion awards
 Hum Awards
 Lux Style Awards

Pakistani fashion schools
Here is a list of Pakistani fashion institutes.
Pakistan Institute of Fashion and Design
National College of Arts
Indus Valley School of Art and Architecture
National Textile University
Punjab Tianjin University of Technology

Pakistani fashion media
Here is a list of Pakistani fashion media.
Fashion Central
Style 360
Fashion TV Pakistan

See also
 1950s in Pakistani fashion
 1970s in Pakistani fashion
 2000s in Pakistani fashion
 2010s in Pakistani fashion

References